FanimeCon is an annual four-day anime convention held during May at the San Jose McEnery Convention Center in San Jose, California, over Memorial Day weekend.

Programming
The convention typically offers an AMV contest, artist's alley, contests, cosplay chess, dances, dealer's room,  formal ball, game room (arcade, console, PC, and tabletop), karaoke, maid cafe, masquerade, panels, screenings, a swap meet, tournaments, and workshops. The convention offers 24-hour programming, including gaming and video.

FanimeCon held an art auction for the charity Habitat for Humanity in 2004. Charities that FanimeCon supported in 2011 included the American Red Cross of Silicon Valley, APA Family Support Services of San Francisco, Cancer Support Community, and Japanese Red Cross Society.

History
FanimeCon was first held in 1994 at California State University, Hayward, being run by several anime clubs. Foothill College would also host the convention until moving to the Wyndham Hotel in San Jose for 1999. From 2000 to 2003 the Santa Clara Convention Center hosted FanimeCon. In 2004, FanimeCon moved to the San Jose McEnery Convention Center.

Problems with the convention in 2009 included Christian protests and over purchasing of artist alley tables, with the protesters also returning in 2010. In 2011, Saturday saw three hour registration waits, problems with the convention not using a printed schedule, outside religious protesters, and the Marriott fire alarm being pulled on Monday morning. Registration was affected in 2012 by a power outage. FanimeCon's 20th anniversary in 2014 was marked by San Jose having Fanime Day on May 23, 2014. The masquerade in 2015 suffered from technical issues. FanimeCon's masquerade for 2016 was scheduled to run for five hours. FanimeCon 2020 was canceled due to the COVID-19 pandemic. FanimeCon was changed to a virtual event for 2021.

Event history

References

External links

 

Anime conventions in the United States
Annual events in Silicon Valley
Culture of San Jose, California
San Francisco Bay Area conventions
Recurring events established in 1994
1994 establishments in California
Tourist attractions in Santa Clara County, California
Tourist attractions in San Jose, California